Engelmann Woods Natural Area consists of  in northeastern Franklin County, Missouri. It is located southwest of the town of St. Albans on a bluff overlooking the Missouri River.

Engelmann Woods preserves one of the last old growth forests in Missouri. In 1942, private landowners, primarily Mrs. Oscar Johnson, donated the land to the Missouri Botanical Garden. The Missouri Department of Conservation acquired the area in the 1980s, and it was designated a natural area in 1983.

There is a  hiking trail in the area, and hunting and fishing are not permitted in the area.

References

Conservation Areas of Missouri
Protected areas established in 1942
Protected areas of Franklin County, Missouri